The Birth of Venus is an oil-on-canvas painting by Jean-Honoré Fragonard, produced between 1753 and 1755. It is held by the Musée Grobet-Labadié in Marseille.  Fragonard used a mix of red chalk and other media to sketch the work before transferring it onto canvas. This sketch is in the Smith College Museum of Art. The Birth of Venus and its sketch are also an example of Fragonard's habit of reversing scene direction and figure positions in order to achieve an ideal composition; Fragonard had made multiple changes to subject placement between the sketch and the final version.

References

Sources
 
 

Paintings by Jean-Honoré Fragonard
1755 paintings
Nude art
Paintings of Venus